This is a list of World Association of Girl Guides and Girl Scouts members.

Table of members
The World Association of Girl Guides and Girl Scouts recognizes at most one Guiding organization per country.  Some countries have several organizations combined as a federation, with different component groups divided on the basis of religions (France, Denmark), ethnic identification (Israel) or language (Belgium).

Non-sovereign territories with independent WAGGGS member organizations
Aruba - Het Arubaanse Padvindsters Gilde: Associate Member of the World Association of Girl Guides and Girl Scouts
Cook Islands - The Girl Guides Cook Islands Association: Associate Member of the World Association of Girl Guides and Girl Scouts
Hong Kong - Hong Kong Girl Guides Association: Full Member of the World Association of Girl Guides and Girl Scouts
Netherlands Antilles - Padvindstersvereniging van de Nederlandse Antillen: Full Member of the World Association of Girl Guides and Girl Scouts

Sovereign countries with Guiding run by another sovereign state

Girl Scouts of the USA
Federated States of Micronesia - Scouting in the Federated States of Micronesia - Girl Scouts of the USA
Marshall Islands - Scouting in the Marshall Islands - Girl Scouts of the USA
Palau - Scouting in Palau - Girl Scouts of the USA

Non-sovereign territories with Guiding run by a sovereign state

Denmark
Faroe Islands - Føroya Skótaráð
Greenland - Grønlands Spejderkorps

France
Guiding in the following areas is run by different French Scout associations:
French Guiana - Scouting in French Guiana
Guadeloupe and Saint Martin - Scouting in Guadeloupe et Saint Martin
Martinique - Scouts et Guides de Martinique
Mayotte - Scouting in Mayotte
New Caledonia - Scouting in New Caledonia
Réunion - Scouting on Réunion
Saint Pierre and Miquelon - Scouting in Saint Pierre and Miquelon
Wallis and Futuna - Scouting in Wallis and Futuna

United Kingdom
Anguilla - Girlguiding Anguilla
Bermuda - Girlguiding Bermuda
British Virgin Islands - British Virgin Islands Girl Guide Association
Cayman Islands - Girlguiding Cayman Islands
Falkland Islands - Girlguiding Falkland Islands
Gibraltar - Girlguiding Gibraltar
Montserrat - Girlguiding Montserrat
Saint Helena - Girlguiding Saint Helena
Turks and Caicos Islands - Turks and Caicos Islands branch of Girlguiding UK

United States
The following areas are administered by the Girl Scouts of the USA:
American Samoa - Scouting in American Samoa
Guam - Scouting in Guam
Northern Mariana Islands - Scouting in the Northern Mariana Islands
Puerto Rico - Scouting in Puerto Rico
United States Virgin Islands - Scouting in the United States Virgin Islands

Countries working towards WAGGGS membership
"Working towards WAGGGS membership" is an official status by WAGGGS acknowledging the development of an association. As of 2017, three countries have this status: 
Mozambique - Mozambique Guides
São Tomé and Príncipe - Associação Guias de São Tomé and Príncipe
Vietnam - Vietnam Scouting National Council (Girl Guides section)

Countries with Guiding organizations, work towards recognition unclear
Algeria - Scouting in Algeria
Iraq - Iraq Boy Scouts and Girl Guides Council
Morocco - Scouting in Morocco
Nauru - Scouting and Guiding in Nauru

Former members of WAGGGS
Cuba - Asociación de Guías de Cuba, last mentioned in 1969
Ethiopia - last mentioned in 1984, now part of Ethiopia Scout Association
Indonesia - Gerakan Pramuka left WAGGGS and joined WOSM in 2002
Iran - Fereshtegan-e Pishahang-e Īrān, last mentioned in 1979
Samoa - Samoa Girl Guides Association, membership cancelled in 2008
Tuvalu - Girl Guides Association of Tuvalu, membership withdrawn in 2005
Uruguay - Asociación Guías Scout del Uruguay, membership cancelled in 2014
Vanuatu - Vanuatu Girl Guides Association, membership cancelled in 2008
Vietnam - Hội Nữ Hướng Đạo Việt Nam, last mentioned in 1973

See also

List of World Organization of the Scout Movement members

References

World Association of Girl Guides and Girl Scouts, World Bureau (1997), Trefoil Round the World. Eleventh Edition 1997.

External links
wagggs.org: Member organizations

World Association of Girl Guides and Girl Scouts

World Association of Girl Guides and Girl Scouts
World Association of Girl Guides and Girl Scouts